Bregnør Fiskerleje is a fishing village to the northeast of Odense, and northwest of Kerteminde in Kerteminde Municipality, Funen, Denmark. Bregnor lies 2.3 miles (3.7 km) to the southeast of the entrance passage to Odense Fjord, and contains a small harbour.

References

Suburbs of Odense
Populated places in Funen
Populated coastal places in Denmark
Kerteminde Municipality